Bintulu Development Authority (Malay: Lembaga Kemajuan Bintulu) (BDA) is a local council which administers Bintulu town and other areas of Bintulu Division. The agency is under the purview of Sarawak Ministry of Local Government and Community Development.

History 
BDA was established on 8 July 1978 by Sarawak state government following the discovery of huge reserves of natural gas and oil offshore Bintulu.

Purpose
BDA is responsible to facilitate industrial, tertiary sector of the economy, and social development in Bintulu town and Bintulu Division. Besides, it also functions to manage residential, trade and commerce industry and provides facilities and amenities for the well-being of the people in Bintulu.

Administration
Designated area for BDA covers a total area of 12,515 km2 including 5 km offshore Bintulu Division. The area of administration contains Bintulu district and Tatau district.

References

Local government in Sarawak